The Chickatawbut Observation Tower is a historic tower on Chickatawbut Road in Quincy, Massachusetts, in the Blue Hill Reservation, a Massachusetts state park.

Unlike Great Blue Hill Observation Tower, a similar tower at the opposite end of the reservation, Chickatawbut tower is not open to the public. The tower was built by the Civilian Conservation Corps in the 1930s.  It is named for Chickatawbut, who was a 17th-century sachem of the Massachusett Indian tribe.

The tower was added to the National Register of Historic Places in 1980.

See also
National Register of Historic Places listings in Quincy, Massachusetts

References

Buildings and structures on the National Register of Historic Places in Massachusetts
Buildings and structures in Quincy, Massachusetts
Civilian Conservation Corps in Massachusetts
Observation towers on the National Register of Historic Places
Towers in Massachusetts
National Register of Historic Places in Quincy, Massachusetts